Chowchilla Elementary School District is a public school district based in Madera County, California.

It feeds into Chowchilla Union High School District, which operates Chowchilla Union High School.

It includes Chowchilla and Fairmead.

Schools
Grades 7–8: Wilson Middle School
Grades 5–6: Fairmead School
Grades 3–4: Ronald Reagan Schiool
until grade 2:
Stephens School (starts at "TK")
Merle L. Fuller School (starts at preschool)

References

External links
 

School districts in Madera County, California